Limit load can refer to:

 Limit load (aeronautics), the maximum load factor during flight
 Limit load (physics), maximum load that a structure can safely carry
 Working load limit, the load that a lifting device can safely lift